is a Japanese actor. He was represented by T-artist and Riche Management and later, in May 2016, became a freelancer.

Kawai graduated from Waseda Jitsugyo Gakko High School and Waseda University School of Social Sciences.

Filmography

TV drama

Films

Short films

Music videos

Documentaries

TV variety

Advertisements

Stage

Internet series

DVD

Photobooks

Others

References

External links
 

Waseda University alumni
1983 births
Living people
Male actors from Tokyo
People from Fuchū, Tokyo